Sone (曽根, 素根, 曾禰)  is a Japanese surname. Notable people with this surname include:

, Japanese judoka
, Japanese politician
, Japanese film director
, Japanese competitive eater and singer
, Japanese judoka
, Japanese athlete
Monica Sone (1919–2011), Japanese-American writer
Yasuo Sone (born 1950), Japanese professional golfer
, Japanese waka poet
, contemporary artist

Other people
Hubert Lafayette Sone (1892–1970), American Methodist missionary in China

See also
Sone (disambiguation)

Japanese-language surnames